Peter Davison (born 1948) is an American composer known for New Age/Neo Classical works, and television and film scores.

Early years 
Davison was born in Los Angeles, California.  He played flute, saxophone, guitar, keyboards and electric bass in all sorts of ensembles throughout his public school years.  He received his Bachelor's and master's degrees in Music Composition from California State University, Northridge.

Career 
Davison has composed music scores for Indie Features, the History Channel, A+E, Biography, PBS, Warner Bros., Disney, Universal, Discovery, Gaiam (Yoga/Relaxation music).   Over 40 CDs of his music are on Higher Octave/Universal, Gaiam, Davisounds and TSR/Baja. His CDs Meditate and Exhale were both in the Billboard Top 10 New Age Albums.  His music is widely played in internet radio.  On Pandora  at this time there are 90 million streams of his music with similar stats on the other internet music providers such as Spotify. He has received awards and nominations from the Global Music Awards, Hollywood Music in Media Awards, Accolade Global Film Awards, Colortape International Film Festival and others.  Davison's first 7 releases (1980-1986) are considered pioneers of New Age Music.  Fact of Being, a European label has re-released the first 2 of these  on vinyl LP.  They will re-release the remaining 5 over the next 2 years, as a retrospective of Davison's early work.  Davison has also received commissions for classical orchestral music.

Discography

Television, Film scores

References 

American composers
1948 births
Living people